The Copa Polla Gol 1981 was the 11th edition of the Chilean Cup tournament. The competition started on February 28, 1981, and concluded on May 16, 1981. Only first level teams took part in the tournament. Colo-Colo won the competition for their third time, beating Audax Italiano, 5–1, in the final. The points system in the first round awarded 2 points for a win, and increased to 3 points if the team scored 4 or more goals. In the event of a tie, each team was awarded 1 point, but no points were awarded if the score was 0–0.

Calendar

Group Round

Group 1

Group 2

Group 3

Quarterfinals

|}

Semifinals

Final

Top goalscorers
 Víctor Cabrera (San Luis) 8 goals,
 Leonardo Zamora (Everton) 8 goals

See also
 1981 Campeonato Nacional

References

RSSSF

Chile
1981
Copa